André Carlos Alves de Paula Filho (born 22 July 1961) is a Brazilian politician from the Social Democratic Party. In January 2023, he joined the second cabinet of Lula da Silva as Minister of Fishing and Aquaculture. He previously served in the Brazilian Congress as a Federal Deputy from Pernambuco.

Early life 
He was born in Recife.

References 

Living people
1961 births
Social Democratic Party (Brazil, 2011) politicians
21st-century Brazilian politicians
Government ministers of Brazil
Members of the Chamber of Deputies (Brazil) from Pernambuco
Politicians from Recife